Grant Hall (born 1991) is an English footballer who plays for Middlesbrough.

Grant Hall may also refer to:

 Grant Hall (Queen's University), a landmark on the campus of Queen's University, Kingston, Ontario, Canada
 Grant Hall, Rothes, a community hall in Rothes, Scotland
 Grant Hall, the symbol of Fort Leavenworth and headquarters of the U.S. Army Combined Arms Center
 Grant Hall, formerly cadet mess hall, now social center at West Point, the United States Military Academy

See also
Grant Building (disambiguation)

Architectural disambiguation pages